= Topical Play Week =

Topical Play Week Тиждень актуальної п'єси
- Genre: Educational drama festival
- Frequency: Annual
- Country: Ukraine
- Founded: 2011

The Topical Play Week (Ukrainian: Тиждень актуальної п'єси) is an educational drama festival held annually in Kyiv, Ukraine. The festival consists of readings of poetic and dramatic texts submitted by international playwrights in Ukrainian. Founded in 2011 by Marysia Nikitiuk, Andrew May, and Natalia Vorozhbit, the festival seeks to allow new playwrights to share their work with directors and spectators. The festival also gives out the Readers' Award for exceptional texts.
